The Commonwealth Club of Adelaide was a men's social club in Adelaide, South Australia, whose members were mostly high-ranking officials, successful businessmen and professionals.
The club never had rooms of its own, but met once a month for a catered lunch in one or other of Adelaide's large cafes (Bricknell's, Balfour's or Bishop's) or, for high-profile guest speakers, the Adelaide Town Hall.
Meetings consisted mostly of talks by members or guest speakers, followed by discussions and socializing. As with most service clubs, talks and discussions were expected to be non-sectarian in religion and non-partisan in politics. 
The club was formed as a result of a meeting called for March 1910 at the Adelaide Town Hall by S. H. Skipper, a popular Adelaide barrister, and son of journalist Spencer Skipper. 

Famous figures who addressed the Club include Oscar Asche, Lord Baden-Powell, Colin Bednall, Lord Bruce, W. W. Campbell (of Lick Observatory), Noël Coward, Alfred Deakin, Anthony Eden, Andrew Fisher, Bert Hinkler, William Morris Hughes, Sir Harry Lauder, Douglas Mawson, Field-Marshal Lord Montgomery, Sir Ross Smith and Sir Keith Smith, G. S. Titheradge, Sir Archibald Weigall, G. H. Wilkins, . . .

History

Notes

References 

1910 establishments in Australia
History of Adelaide
Clubs and societies in Australia